Asperula cypria is an erect or spreading woody subshrub 30–60 cm high. Flowers  whitish or tinged pink or red, flowering in May–June.

Habitat 
Dry rocky limestone or igneous hillsides, sometimes under pines at 150–1200 m altitude.

Distribution 
Endemic to Cyprus where it is common especially in the lowlands.

References

External links
 http://www.theplantlist.org/tpl/record/kew-16808
 http://ww2.bgbm.org/herbarium/images/B/10/03/41/08/B_10_0341082.jpg

cypria
Endemic flora of Cyprus